MCIA can refer to:

Ottawa Macdonald–Cartier International Airport
Mactan–Cebu International Airport
Marine Corps Intelligence Activity
Mauritius Cane Industry Authority
Mexico City International Airport